24 News HD, or 24 Digital is an Urdu language current affairs news television channel based in Lahore, Pakistan and launched in 2015. The channel is owned by Mohsin Naqvi who is the founder of City News Group.

History
The channel was founded as a current affairs-focused channel in 2015 by Mohsin Naqvi.

Programs
Channel 24 broadcasts the following programs:
 Noor e Sahar
 Ab Masood Raza Keh Saath
 Breakfast with Sajjad Mir 
 DNA with Anjum Rasheed and Khushnood Ali Khan
 Investigator 24
 Point Of View
 Sona Chandi ka Pakistan
 Nasim Zehra @8
 Q Kay Jomhoriyat hai
 Anjaam
 Inkishaaf

See also

 List of television stations in Pakistan
List of news channels in Pakistan

References

External links

 City 42 -
 24 News Urdu -
 Rohi
 

2015 establishments in Pakistan
24-hour television news channels in Pakistan
Urdu-language mass media
Television channels and stations established in 2015
Television stations in Lahore
Television stations in Pakistan